Paul Muxlow is a Republican politician from Michigan who served in the Michigan House of Representatives for three terms of office.

Muxlow is the owner of Muxlow and Associates Real Estate, and is a former student services coordinator at the local vocational/technical center. He is a former teacher and counselor at the Lapeer County Intermediate School District and formerly a Michigan Air National Guard member.

References

1938 births
Living people
Michigan Republicans
People from Brown City, Michigan
American real estate brokers
University of Michigan alumni
Eastern Michigan University alumni
21st-century American politicians